Horsham St Faith is a village in Norfolk, England. It is near Norwich International Airport, which began in 1939 as RAF Horsham St Faith and home of the City of Norwich Aviation Museum. Administratively it is in the civil parish of Horsham St Faith and Newton St Faith  within the district of Broadland. It also forms part the wider Norwich Built-up area.

The name 'Horsham' means 'horse homestead/village'.

It has the remains of a Horsford Castle, a motte and bailey castle, on the Horsford side of the A140 road, reached by following a track to the north of Church Street, which joins Horsford and Horsham St Faith.

On 17 October from the early 12th century until 1872 it played host to one of the country's largest cattle fairs. This fair was held to the south of Spixworth Road around Bullock Hill and Calf Lane.

At the beginning of the 20th century, the Manor House and the land that in 1939 became RAF Horsham St Faith, was owned by John Thomas Spurrell, youngest son of Richard James Spurrell, of Thurgarton. Inside the church at Horsham St Faith there is a memorial to his eldest son, John Francis Brabazon Spurrell, who was killed by buffalo at Kibaya, Tanganyika, in 1927.

The Church of St Mary and St Andrew 

The present day church dates back to the 13th century and has undergone many changes. Much of the building was restored in 1873 with a £1400 donation from the Twinings tea family. Of interest inside the church is the rood screen dated 1528 and adorned with 12 panels depicting saints. Also, of note is the elaborate Jacobean font cover.
The pulpit is also of note, with painted panels recently restored by the V & A Museum.

The use of the church is shared with the Methodists.

Notable residents
 St Robert Southwell - Jesuit priest, poet and martyr.

See also 
 Horsham St Faith and Newton St Faith

Notes 

http://kepn.nottingham.ac.uk/map/place/Norfolk/Horsham%20St.%20Faith%20with%20Newton%20St.%20Faith

Further reading 
Horsham and Newton St Faith (Towns and Villages)
The Priory of Horsham St Faith
Drayton and St Faith Medical Practice history.
Information on the Parish Church of St Mary and St Andrew Horsham St Faith

External links
St Faith Village Website
Information on the Parish Church of St Mary and St Andrew Horsham St Faith
Horsham St Faith watermill

Villages in Norfolk
Broadland
Monasteries dissolved under the English Reformation